The following radio stations broadcast on FM frequency 105.7 MHz:

Argentina
 A in Mendoza
 Cadena norte in Jesús María, Córdoba
 Cien in Villa Carlos Paz, Córdoba
 Ciudad in Bahía Blanca, Buenos Aires
 Corazón Disco in Buenos Aires
 Diagonal in Machagai, Chaco
 Famailla in Famaillá, Tucumán
 Glaciar in Río Gallegos, Santa Cruz
 Imaginate in Chivilcoy, Buenos Aires
 La Misma Fe in San Nicolás de los Arroyos, Buenos Aires
 Oasis in Puan, Buenos Aires
 Ok in Florencio Varela, Buenos Aires
 Pasión in Rosario, Santa Fe
 Planeta in Buenos Aires
 Redentor in Rosario, Santa Fe
 Radio María in San Martín, Mendoza

Australia
 8DDD in Darwin, Northern Territory
 2KY in Taree, New South Wales
 ABC Far North in Cooktown, Queensland
 ABC NewsRadio in Mount Gambier, South Australia
 2HVR in Muswellbrook, New South Wales
 ABC Western Queensland in Roma, Queensland
 Radio National in Toowoomba, Queensland
 Radio National in Woomera, South Australia
 Rhema FM in Mount Isa, Queensland
 SBS Radio in Hobart, Tasmania
 2BDR in Albury, New South Wales
 2JJJ in Sydney, New South Wales
 Radio Metro in Gold Coast, Queensland

Brazil
 ZYD 658 in Santa Maria, Rio Grande do Sul

Canada (Channel 289)
 CBAF-FM-2 in Allardville, New Brunswick
 CBAM-FM-1 in Sackville, New Brunswick
 CBU-FM in Vancouver, British Columbia
 CBYS-FM in Sparwood, British Columbia
 CFDM-FM in Meadow Lake, Saskatchewan
 CFGL-FM in Laval, Quebec
 CHQC-FM in Saint John, New Brunswick
 CHRE-FM in St. Catharines, Ontario
 CIBQ-FM in Brooks, Alberta
 CICF-FM in Vernon, British Columbia
 CIKR-FM in Kingston, Ontario
 CJMI-FM in Strathroy, Ontario
 CKKN-FM-2 in Mackenzie, British Columbia
 VOAR-9-FM in Corner Brook, Newfoundland and Labrador

China
 CNR Tibetan Radio in Lhasa
 Shanghai Jiao Tong Tai in Shanghai

Iraq 
 XFM 105.7

Italy
 Radio Ciroma 105.7 in Cosenza, Calabria

Malaysia
 Ai FM in Kota Bharu, Kelantan
 Lite in Klang Valley and Eastern Pahang
 Nasional FM in Johor Bahru, Johor and Singapore

Mexico
 XHBM-FM in San Luis Potosí, San Luis Potosí
 XHDE-FM in Arteaga, Coahuila
XHECH-FM in Purépero, Michoacán
XHEMI-FM in Cosoleacaque, Veracruz
XHIU-FM in Oaxaca, Oaxaca
XHJAC-FM in Jacona-Zamora, Michoacán
XHLJ-FM in Lagos de Moreno, Jalisco
XHOF-FM in Mexico City
XHOS-FM in Ciudad Obregón, Sonora
 XHPRS-FM in Tecate, Baja California
XHR-FM in Linares, Nuevo León
XHRUC-FM in Ciudad Cuauhtémoc, Chihuahua
XHSCBX-FM in Santiago Juxtlahuaca, Oaxaca
XHSCCI-FM in Pedernales, Tacámbaro, Michoacán
 XHTH-FM in Palizada, Campeche
XHVOC-FM in Bahía de Kino, Sonora
XHXT-FM in Tepic, Nayarit

Saint Vincent and the Grenadines
 Praise FM (Saint Vincent and the Grenadines)

South Korea
 Korea New Network's Seoul Broadcasting System's Radio Station LOVE FM Relay Chanel

United Kingdom
 105.7 Smooth Radio in Birmingham and the West Midlands
 105.7 Mearns FM in South Aberdeenshire
 105.7 Capital FM in Edinburgh & Fife

United States (Channel 289)
 KBGB in Magness, Arkansas
 KBIC in Raymondville, Texas
 KCPJ-LP in Crete, Nebraska
 KDIL-LP in Kennewick, Washington
 KDXN in South Heart, North Dakota
 KHCB-FM in Houston, Texas
 KJET in Union, Washington
 KJJP in Amarillo, Texas
 KJRL in Herington, Kansas
 KJVI in Robert Lee, Texas
 KKQX in Manhattan, Montana
 KMCK-FM in Prairie Grove, Arkansas
 KMDG in Hays, Kansas
 KMVN in Anchorage, Alaska
 KNAF-FM in Fredericksburg, Texas
 KOAS in Dolan Springs, Arizona
 KOHM in Ridgecrest, California
 KOKZ in Waterloo, Iowa
 KOZZ-FM in Reno, Nevada
 KPMX in Sterling, Colorado
 KPNT in Collinsville, Illinois
 KQAK in Bend, Oregon
 KQMX in Lost Hills, California
 KRBL in Idalou, Texas
 KRDR in Alva, Oklahoma
 KRNB in Decatur, Texas
 KROU in Spencer, Oklahoma
 KRSE in Yakima, Washington
 KSUX in Winnebago, Nebraska
 KTKO (FM) in Beeville, Texas
 KTYV in Steamboat Springs, Colorado
 KUXX in Jackson, Minnesota
 KVAY in Lamar, Colorado
 KVGL in Manderson, Wyoming
 KVRD-FM in Cottonwood, Arizona
 KVRU-LP in Seattle, Washington
 KVVF in Santa Clara, California
 KVVP in Leesville, Louisiana
 KWBR-LP in Saint George, Utah
 KWGL in Ouray, Colorado
 KXCJ-LP in Cave Junction, Oregon
 KXKX in Knob Noster, Missouri
 KXRS in Hemet, California
 KYKX in Longview, Texas
 KZBD in Spokane, Washington
 KZGI in Sedro-Woolley, Washington
 WAKH in McComb, Mississippi
 WAPL in Appleton, Wisconsin
 WBNW-FM in Endicott, New York
 WBZY in Canton, Georgia
 WCHR-FM in Manahawkin, New Jersey
 WCJZ in Cannelton, Indiana
 WCLN-FM in Rennert, North Carolina
 WCSN-FM in Orange Beach, Alabama
 WCUP in L'anse, Michigan
 WDTL in Indianola, Mississippi
 WECA-LP in Palm Bay, Florida
 WEMA-LP in Marlborough, Pennsylvania
 WEMZ-LP in Plymouth, Pennsylvania
 WERF-LP in Gainesville, Florida
 WETF-LP in South Bend, Indiana
 WEZY in Chippewa Falls, Wisconsin
 WFFM in Ashburn, Georgia
 WFRF-FM in Monticello, Florida
 WGAY in Sugarloaf Key, Florida
 WGEO-LP in Georgetown, South Carolina
 WGRK-FM in Greensburg, Kentucky
 WHBE-FM in Eminence, Kentucky
 WHMX in Lincoln, Maine
 WHTI in Salem, West Virginia
 WHWS-LP in Geneva, New York
 WIHG in Rockwood, Tennessee
 WIXO in Peoria, Illinois
 WJGM in Baldwin, Florida
 WJKL in San Juan, Puerto Rico
 WJUK-LP in Plymouth, Indiana
 WJZ-FM in Catonsville, Maryland
 WKJS in Richmond, Virginia
 WLBM-LP in Danville, Illinois
 WLGC-FM in Greenup, Kentucky
 WLKC in Campton, New Hampshire
 WLKJ in Portage, Pennsylvania
 WLUB in Augusta, Georgia
 WLWM-LP in Charlestown, New Hampshire
 WMCC-LP in Spencer, West Virginia
 WMJI in Cleveland, Ohio
 WMXH-FM in Luray, Virginia
 WNHS-LP in Newcomerstown, Ohio
 WPGR-LP in Clear Lake, Wisconsin
 WQAH-FM in Addison, Alabama
 WQAK in Union City, Tennessee
 WQBK-FM in Malta, New York
 WQJT-LP in Freeport, Illinois
 WQXA-FM in York, Pennsylvania
 WROR-FM in Framingham, Massachusetts
 WRSF in Columbia, North Carolina
 WSRW-FM in Grand Rapids, Michigan
 WSVP-LP in Springvale, Maine
 WTBK in Manchester, Kentucky
 WUCL in De Kalb, Mississippi
 WUUK-LP in Canadohta Lake, Pennsylvania
 WUZR in Bicknell, Indiana
 WVBZ in Clemmons, North Carolina
 WWLL in Sebring, Florida
 WWWM-FM in Eden Prairie, Minnesota
 WXCX in Siren, Wisconsin
 WXPB-LP in Athens, Georgia
 WXZX in Hilliard, Ohio
 WYXB in Indianapolis, Indiana
 WZHT in Troy, Alabama
 WZOM in Defiance, Ohio
 WZTK in Alpena, Michigan

References

Lists of radio stations by frequency